Harlot is an archaic name for a prostitute.

Harlot may also refer to:
Harlot (1964 film)
Harlot (1971 film), pornographic film
Harlot (poetry collection), 2007 anthology by Jill Alexander Essbaum
Hellfire Harlots, a roller derby league based in Nottingham, England
We Are Harlot, or Harlot, a rock band
Harlots (TV series), 2017 Hulu series